Glory Lane (1987) is a science fiction novel by American writer Alan Dean Foster. The book takes place outside of either of Foster’s two usual universes, Spellsinger and the Humanx Commonwealth.

Plot summary

Teenage punk rock fan and high-school dropout Seeth (née Seth) and his older brother, geeky graduate student Kerwin, rescue a stranger from arrest at a bowling alley in their hometown of Albuquerque, New Mexico, only to discover that the cops are killer aliens and that the bowling ball the stranger carries is intelligent. Seeth, Kerwin and the stranger, quickly joined by a valley girl-type named Miranda, soon find themselves on the run, not just on the streets of Earth, but among the stars as well, and in the middle of an intergalactic battle for Izmir, the "bowling ball".

External links
 

1987 American novels
1987 science fiction novels
Novels by Alan Dean Foster
Ace Books books